Lord of Grobbendonk is a feudal Flemish title originating from Grobbendonk. This title belongs today to the Belgian nobility.

History 
The origin of this important hereditary title goes back to the 13th century. The lordship was in possession of different Flemish noble houses at different times: van Wilre, van Crayenhem, Brant, van Jauche, van Mastaing, and finally Schetz. The lordship was created a county in 1637 by royal decree of King Philip IV of Spain. Currently it is held by the descendants of the house of Schetz: the current duke of Ursel is still Count of Grobbendonk.

Lords of Grobbendonk 
Hendrik van Wilre, Lord of Grobbendonk and Lord Mayor of Leuven.
Arnold, Lord of Crayenhem and Grobbendonq, died 1302. x Marie of Wesemaele.
Arnold II of Crayenhem 1360-, Lord of Grobbendonk.
Isabeau of Craienhem, Lady of Grobbendoncq, married to Jean III Brant, 3rd lord of Ayseau.
Arnoult Brant, Lord of Grobbendoncq; married to Catherine of Heinsberge.
Marghareta Brant; Lady of Grobbendoncq: sold Grobbendoncq to: 
Philip of Cleves, Lord of Ravenstein
 Amelberga of Cleves, Lady of Grobbendoncq; married to Andrew of Jauche, Count of Mastaing
 Philippe of Jauches, Lord of Grobbendoncq

House of Schetz 

 Erasmus II Schetz, died 1550, Lord of Usbach and Grobbendonk,
 Gaspard II Schetz, (1513–1580), Lord of Grobbendonk, Lord of Wezenmael.
 Anthonie II Schetz, (1564–1641), since 1602 Baron of Grobbendonk, since in 1637 1st Count of Grobbendonck , Royal decree of King Felipe IV.
 Lancelot II Schetz, (died 1664), 2nd Count of Grobbendonk, lord mayor of Brussels.
 Conrad III Schetz, later Conrad d'Ursel (1553–1632), 1st Baron of Hoboken.

House of Ursel 

 Conrard-Albert, 1st Duke d'Ursel, Count of Grobbendonk.
 Charles-Joseph, 4th Duke d'Ursel, Count of Grobbendonk.
 Marie Joseph Charles, 6th Duke d'Ursel, Count of Grobbendonk.
 Robert, 7th Duke d'Ursel, Count of Grobbendonk.
 Henry Charles Francis Joseph Marie, 8th Duke d'Ursel, Count of Grobbendonk.
 Antonin d'Ursel (1925–1989), 9th Duke of Ursel, Count of Grobbendonk.
 Stéphane d'Ursel (1971), 10th Duke of Ursel, Count of Grobbendonk.

References

Gr
 
 
Lists of Belgian nobility